The San Francisco Film Critics Circle Award for Best Animated Feature is an award given by the San Francisco Film Critics Circle to honor an outstanding animated film.

Winners

2000s

2010s

2020s

Awards for best animated feature film
San Francisco Film Critics Circle Awards
Lists of films by award